Pyrausta fulvalis is a moth in the family Crambidae. It is found in Argentina.

References

Moths described in 1908
fulvalis
Moths of South America